The Restaurant is reality television programme produced by Vision Independent Productions in Ireland. The series first premiered on public service broadcaster RTÉ One where it ran for eight seasons. After a six-year hiatus the show was renewed by the TV3 Group. The show aired its ninth season on Virgin Media One (formerly known as "TV3") from January 2015.

History

The show premiered on RTÉ One in the 2000s. The show ran for eight seasons on the public service broadcaster after a six-year hiatus the show was recommissioned by the [TV3 Group. The ninth season aired on TV3 Ireland from 2015. Each episode features a different head chef, usually claimed to have some sort of celebrity background. Sometimes politicians would participate, among them Enda Kenny, Ruairi Quinn, Michael Healy-Rae and Alan Shatter.

When it aired on RTÉ it proved to be a very successful format often beating even the likes of Neven Maguire and Donal Skehan's cookery shows in the ratings.

Format
Each episode sees a celebrity head chef taking on the culinary challenge of producing a full three-course meal with two wines. This meal is then served to the restaurant's customers and the resident critics, Tom Doorley and Paolo Tullio, who are joined each week by a guest critic.

The head chef arrives on location at 10:00 on the day of filming and immediately begins working with the team. The head chef's first task is to describe their own menu to the kitchen staff. The head chef works with Workovich on starters, McAllister on the main courses and Lennox on desserts. They prepare their meal until 18:30 and diners enter the restaurant at 19:00. The head chef leaves the kitchen at 22:00 to reveal their identity to the dining room. The chef's identity remains a secret to those being served their food until the end of the show when all has been eaten. The critics give the meal a star rating of between one and five, which is then pulled from an envelope after the head chef joins the critics' table.

The Restaurant is voiced over by Seán Moncrieff and the restaurant is manned by John Healy, Maitre'D; the kitchen staff, chefs David Workowich, Stephen McAllister and Louise Lennox and food researcher, Stephen Quin, and waiting staff, waitress, Elaine Normile and waiters, Lee Bradshaw and Vivian Reynolds.

During its original run on RTÉ The Restaurant moved location to County Westmeath, where filming took place at Wineport Lodge overlooking Lough Ree, in Glassan village.

RTÉ also published The Restaurant – The Magazine, which included images and recipes from the series.

The seventh series began on 16 November 2008, running on Sundays at 20:30. RTÉ had eight series in total.

List of episodes

RTÉ Series 1–5?

RTÉ Series 6?

RTÉ Series 7

RTÉ Series 8

2015 revival
The series returned on TV3 on 7 January 2015. The programme was sponsored by Aldi and voiced by Sean Moncrieff. The six-part series was filmed at Wineport Lodge in Glasson, County Westmeath in November 2014, with each episode running to one hour. The regular food critics are Paolo Tullio and Tom Doorley, along with a guest critic each week.

List of episodes
 7 January – Alan Shatter received 4 stars	
 14 January – Jackie Lavin received 2 stars
 21 January – Andrew Trimble received 3 stars.	
 28 January – Marie Cassidy received 4 stars. 
 4 February – Rozanna Purcell received 4 stars.	
 11 February – Sharon Shannon received 3 stars.

A new season began airing on TV3 on 10 February 2016. Marco Pierre White's Courtyard Restaurant in Donnybrook was the new venue for the show, and Marco Pierre White also guested for the series as one of the judges alongside Tom Doorley, replacing Paolo Tullio who died in 2015.

List of episodes
 10 February 2016 – Rory Cowan
 17 February 2016 – Eva Orsmond
 24 February 2016 – Nathan Carter – received 3 stars
 2 March 2016 – Kevin Kilbane - received 4 stars
 9 March 2016 – Pippa O'Connor - received 4 stars
 16 March 2016 – Seán Gallagher - received 3 stars

List of episodes
Maria Walsh
Ken Doherty received 4 Stars

List of episodes
Una Healy one star
Maura Derrane

International versions
The format is sold internationally by Vision Independent Productions under the title The Secret Chef. It has had three seasons in Italy.

References

External links
 

2000s Irish television series
2010s Irish television series
Irish reality television series
Irish television news shows
RTÉ original programming
Virgin Media Television (Ireland) original programming